Pokalchuk is a surname. Notable people with the surname include:

 Oksana Pokalchuk, Ukrainian lawyer and human rights activist
 Yuri Pokalchuk (1941–2008), Ukrainian writer

Surnames of Ukrainian origin